The India cricket team toured the West Indies and the United States during July and August 2022 to play three One Day Internationals (ODIs) and five Twenty20 International (T20I) matches. The ODIs and the first T20I took place in Trinidad and Tobago, the next two T20Is were played in St. Kitts and Nevis, with the final two T20Is played in Lauderhill, Florida. The full details of the tour were confirmed on 1 June 2022.

In the first ODI, India batted first and made 308/7, going on to win the match by just three runs, with the West Indies making 305/6 from their 50 overs. India won the second ODI by two wickets, with just two balls left in the match, to win the series with a match to play. India won the third and final ODI by 119 runs, to take the series 3–0.

Background 
On July 31, after the 1st T20I between West Indies and India, there was an uncertainty on both the team's last two games in the United States, as the members of both the sides did not receive their US visas on time, which forced CWI to think of an alternate plan of scheduling last two matches in West Indies itself. The initial plan was to handover the US travel documents to both teams in St Kitts, when they arrived as the last two matches were scheduled to be held in Central Broward Park in Lauderhill in Florida on August 6 and August 7.

After the 3rd T20I, the teams flew to Georgetown in Guyana after CWI arranged their appointments; with the intervention and diplomatic efforts by Guyana's President Irfaan Ali, both the teams received their visas and the matches went ahead as scheduled. 14 members of the Indian team did not have the travel approvals including the coaching staff, and they had to attend the interviews to get their visas approved which included Indian team's captain Rohit Sharma and coach Rahul Dravid. While Ravindra Jadeja, Ravichandran Ashwin, Dinesh Karthik, Ravi Bishnoi, Suryakumar Yadav and Kuldeep Yadav were already present in Miami as they had their visas issued to them before.

Squads

The West Indies also named Romario Shepherd and Hayden Walsh Jr. as reserve players for the ODI matches. Ahead of the first ODI, Romario Shepherd was added to the West Indies' squad, after Jason Holder tested positive for COVID-19. Hayden Walsh Jr. was added to the West Indies squad for the second ODI after Gudakesh Motie fractured a thumb in the first match.

Ravindra Jadeja was initially ruled out of India's squad for the first two ODI matches due to a knee injury. He was later ruled out of the third ODI after not recovering from the injury, with Shreyas Iyer named as the team's vice-captain for the series in place of Jadeja. KL Rahul not selected in India's ODI squad due to a sports hernia, but he was selected for the T20I squad. However, he then tested positive for COVID-19, and was ruled out of the T20I series. Sanju Samson was later named as Rahul's replacement for the T20I series andHardik Pandya was appointed as the team's vice-captain for the T20I series. During the fourth T20I, Harshal Patel was ruled out after a rib injury, without playing a single match in the series.

ODI series

1st ODI

2nd ODI

3rd ODI

T20I series

1st T20I

2nd T20I

3rd T20I

4th T20I

5th T20I

Notes

References

External links
 Series home at ESPN Cricinfo

2022 in West Indian cricket
2022 in Indian cricket
International cricket competitions in 2022
Indian cricket tours of the West Indies